Girodo is a surname. Notable people with the surname include:

Chad Girodo (born 1991), American baseball player
Paul Girodo (born 1973), Canadian football player